Manuel de Acevedo y Zúñiga (died 1637) was Viceroy of Naples from 14 May 1631 -  12 November 1637.

He was the son of Gaspar de Zúñiga, 5th Count of Monterrey, (Monterrei, Ourense, Spain, 1560–1606), founder of the City of Monterrey, Viceroy of Mexico, 1595–1603, Viceroy of Peru, 1604–1606) and Inés de Velasco y Aragón, daughter of Iñigo Fernández de Velasco, 4th Duke of Frías.

He married Eleonora de Guzmán y Pimentel, daughter  of Enrique de Guzman y Ribera, (1540–1607),  Viceroy of Naples, 1595–1599, while his own sister, Inés de Acevedo y Zúñiga had married Elenora's brother, Gaspar de Guzmán y Pimentel, (Roma, Italy, 1587 – Toro, Spain,  1645), the virtual Spanish Prime Minister,   1621 - 1643.

With such powerful in-laws it is not surprising that Manuel was awarded by his brother in law, Gaspar, the Grandee of Spain on 11 July 1628, and was appointed, too, a Member of the Council of Italy, Ambassador in Rome and in Florence

His family name 
This title of Count of Monterrey was first a Viscounty, awarded 1474 by  Isabel I of Castile and Ferdinand II of Aragon, but was rewarded with the title of County, 24 December 1513,  given to the second Vicountess, Teresa de Zúñiga, married to Sancho Sánchez de Ulloa, Sieur of A Ulloa, Monterroso, Deza and other places located at  Galicia, Spain. The daughter of this Teresa de Zuñiga, a "Ulloa y Zúñiga", married an "Acevedo" and their children took then the compounded name "Acevedo y Zúñiga"  or, sometimes "Zúñiga y Acevedo" using it as a single name albeit being originally compounded.

It is thus sometimes not very clear if a "Zuñiga y Acevedo" comes from this Zuñiga branch, (or Acevedo branch), while other times it could be someone late comer   originating from a Zúñiga and an Acevedo marriage or the other way around. Then, further researches are required  for the sake of completeness of the genealogy. There are other Zúñigas with Jewish ancestry or  related to the powerful and wealthy Dukes of Béjar for instance, besides other branches.

In the case of Manuel it must be understood then that his name "Acevedo y Zúñiga" is but a first name, compounded, many biographers ignoring therefore that his mother, Inés, is/was  a "Velasco", a daughter of the usual "Velasco" family connected, sometimes, to the Dukedom of Frías.

References

Sources
www.grandesp.org.uk

1637 deaths
Viceroys of Naples
17th-century Spanish people
Counts of Spain
Grandees of Spain
Year of birth unknown